The following is a list of state highways in the U.S. state of Louisiana designated in the 1–99 range.


Louisiana Highway 1

Louisiana Highway 1 (LA 1) runs  in a southeast to northwest direction from a dead end in Grand Isle, Jefferson Parish to the Texas state line northwest of Rodessa, Caddo Parish.

Louisiana Highway 2

Louisiana Highway 2 (LA 2) runs  in an east–west direction from the Texas state line southwest of Vivian, Caddo Parish to US 65 north of Lake Providence, East Carroll Parish.

Louisiana Highway 2 Alternate

Louisiana Highway 2 Alternate (LA 2 Alt.) runs  in an east–west direction from the junction of LA 2 and LA 159 in Shongaloo, Caddo Parish to the junction of US 63/US 167 and LA 2 in Bernice, Union Parish.

Louisiana Highway 3

Louisiana Highway 3 (LA 3) runs  in a north–south direction from the junction of I-20, US 71, and LA 72 in Bossier City to the Arkansas state line north of Plain Dealing, Bossier Parish.

Louisiana Highway 4

Louisiana Highway 4 (LA 4) runs  in an east–west direction from US 71 north of Loggy Bayou, Red River Parish to LA 605 in Newellton, Tensas Parish.

Louisiana Highway 5

Louisiana Highway 5 (LA 5) runs  in a general southwest to northeast direction from US 84 in Logansport to LA 175 at Kingston, DeSoto Parish.

Louisiana Highway 6

Louisiana Highway 6 (LA 6) runs  in a southwest to northeast direction from the Texas state line southwest of Many, Sabine Parish to the junction of US 71 and US 84 in Clarence, Natchitoches Parish.

Louisiana Highway 7

Louisiana Highway 7 (LA 7) ran  in a north–south direction from US 71 in Coushatta, Red River Parish to the Arkansas state line at Springhill, Webster Parish. The route was replaced with a part of U.S. Route 371 in 1994.

Louisiana Highway 8

Louisiana Highway 8 (LA 8) runs  in a southwest to northeast direction from the Texas state line west of Burr Ferry, Vernon Parish to the concurrent US 425/LA 15 in Sicily Island, Catahoula Parish.

Louisiana Highway 9

Louisiana Highway 9 (LA 9) runs  in a north–south direction from the concurrent US 71/US 84 in Campti, Natchitoches Parish to the concurrent US 63/US 167 at the Claiborne–Union parish line in Junction City.

Louisiana Highway 10

Louisiana Highway 10 (LA 10) runs  in an east–west direction from US 171 south of Leesville, Vernon Parish to the Mississippi state line east of Bogalusa, Washington Parish.

Louisiana Highway 12

Louisiana Highway 12 (LA 12) runs  in an east–west direction from the Texas state line west of Starks, Calcasieu Parish to the junction of US 171 and US 190 in Ragley, Beauregard Parish.

Louisiana Highway 13

Louisiana Highway 13 (LA 13) runs  in a north–south direction from LA 14 west of Kaplan, Vermilion Parish to US 167 in Turkey Creek, Evangeline Parish.

Louisiana Highway 14

Louisiana Highway 14 (LA 14) runs  in an east–west direction from the junction of US 90 and US 171 in Lake Charles, Calcasieu Parish to LA 182 in New Iberia, Iberia Parish.

Louisiana Highway 15

Louisiana Highway 15 (LA 15) runs  in a north–south direction from the junction of LA 1 and LA 970 northwest of Lettsworth, Pointe Coupee Parish to the concurrent US 63/US 167 in Lillie, Union Parish.

Louisiana Highway 16

Louisiana Highway 16 (LA 16) runs  in a general east–west direction from LA 22 south of French Settlement, Livingston Parish to LA 21 in Sun, Washington Parish.

Louisiana Highway 17

Louisiana Highway 17 (LA 17) runs  in a north–south direction from the junction of US 425/LA 15, LA 4, and LA 130 in Winnsboro, Franklin Parish to the Arkansas state line at Kilbourne, West Carroll Parish.

Louisiana Highway 18

Louisiana Highway 18 (LA 18) runs  in an east–west direction from the junction of LA 1 and LA 3089 in Donaldsonville, Ascension Parish to the junction of US 90 Bus. and LA 23 in Gretna, Jefferson Parish.

Louisiana Highway 19

Louisiana Highway 19 (LA 19) runs  in a north–south direction from US 61 in Baton Rouge, East Baton Rouge Parish to the Mississippi state line north of Norwood, East Feliciana Parish.

Louisiana Highway 20

Louisiana Highway 20 (LA 20) runs  in a southwest to northeast direction from LA 182 in Gibson, Terrebonne Parish to LA 18 in Vacherie, St. James Parish.

Louisiana Highway 21

Louisiana Highway 21 (LA 21) runs  in a north–south direction from the junction of LA 22 and LA 1077 in Madisonville, St. Tammany Parish to the Mississippi state line north of Angie, Washington Parish.

Louisiana Highway 22

Louisiana Highway 22 (LA 22) runs  in an east–west direction from the junction of LA 75 and LA 942 in Darrow, Ascension Parish to US 190 in Mandeville, St. Tammany Parish.

Louisiana Highway 23

Louisiana Highway 23 (LA 23) runs  in a southeast to northwest direction from Jump Basin Road in Venice, Plaquemines Parish to a junction with LA 428 in Gretna, Jefferson Parish.

Louisiana Highway 24

Louisiana Highway 24 (LA 24) runs  in a general east–west direction from LA 20 in Schriever, Terrebonne Parish to LA 3235 in Larose, Lafourche Parish.

Louisiana Highway 25

Louisiana Highway 25 (LA 25) runs  in a north–south direction from US 190 in Covington, St. Tammany Parish to the Mississippi state line north of Warnerton, Washington Parish.

Louisiana Highway 26

Louisiana Highway 26 (LA 26) runs  in a northwest to southeast direction from the concurrent US 171/US 190 southeast of DeRidder, Beauregard Parish to LA 14 in Lake Arthur, Jefferson Davis Parish.

Louisiana Highway 27

Louisiana Highway 27 (LA 27) runs  in a general southeast to northwest direction from LA 14 at Holmwood, Calcasieu Parish to the junction of US 171 and US 190 in DeRidder, Beauregard Parish.

Louisiana Highway 28

Louisiana Highway 28 (LA 28) runs  in an east–west direction from the junction of US 171 and LA 8 in Leesville, Vernon Parish to US 84 west of Jonesville, Catahoula Parish.

Louisiana Highway 29

Louisiana Highway 29 (LA 29) runs  in a north–south direction from LA 13 north of Eunice, St. Landry Parish to LA 114 west of Moreauville, Avoyelles Parish.

Louisiana Highway 30

Louisiana Highway 30 (LA 30) runs  in a northwest to southeast direction from a point near I-10 in Baton Rouge, East Baton Rouge Parish to the junction of US 61 and LA 431 east of Gonzales, Ascension Parish.

Louisiana Highway 31

Louisiana Highway 31 (LA 31) runs  in a north–south direction from LA 182 in New Iberia, Iberia Parish to a second junction with LA 182 in Opelousas, St. Landry Parish.

Louisiana Highway 32

Louisiana Highway 32 (LA 32) ran  in a north–south direction along North Third Street from LA 30 to the Louisiana State Capitol building in Baton Rouge.

Louisiana Highway 33

Louisiana Highway 33 (LA 33) runs  in a north–south direction from US 80 in Ruston, Lincoln Parish to the Arkansas state line north of Marion, Union Parish.

Louisiana Highway 34

Louisiana Highway 34 (LA 34) runs  in a north–south direction from the junction of US 71 and LA 1239-2 in Montgomery, Grant Parish to the concurrent US 80/LA 15 in West Monroe, Ouachita Parish.

Louisiana Highway 35

Louisiana Highway 35 (LA 35) runs  in a north–south direction from LA 82 north of Forked Island, Vermilion Parish to US 190 in Lawtell, St. Landry Parish.

Louisiana Highway 36

Louisiana Highway 36 (LA 36) runs  in an east–west direction from LA 21 east of Covington to LA 41 northwest of Pearl River, St. Tammany Parish.

Louisiana Highway 37

Louisiana Highway 37 (LA 37) runs  in a southwest to northeast direction from the concurrent US 61/US 190 in Baton Rouge, East Baton Rouge Parish to LA 10 in Greensburg, St. Helena Parish.

Louisiana Highway 38

Louisiana Highway 38 (LA 38) runs  in an east–west direction from LA 10 in Coleman Town, St. Helena Parish to LA 430 south of Hackley, Washington Parish.

Louisiana Highway 39

Louisiana Highway 39 (LA 39) runs  in a general north–south direction from a local road southeast of Pointe à la Hache, Plaquemines Parish to I-10 in New Orleans, Orleans Parish.

Louisiana Highway 40

Louisiana Highway 40 (LA 40) runs  in an east–west direction from LA 43 southeast of Montpelier, Livingston Parish to LA 41 in Bush, St. Tammany Parish.

Louisiana Highway 41

Louisiana Highway 41 (LA 41) runs  in a north–south direction from the junction of US 11 and LA 3081 in Pearl River to LA 21 in Bush, St. Tammany Parish.

Louisiana Highway 42

Louisiana Highway 42 (LA 42) runs  in an east–west direction from LA 30 in Baton Rouge, East Baton Rouge Parish to the junction of LA 22 and LA 1037 in Springfield, Livingston Parish.

Louisiana Highway 43

Louisiana Highway 43 (LA 43) runs  in a north–south direction from LA 42 west of Springfield, Livingston Parish to the Mississippi state line north of Easleyville, St. Helena Parish.

Louisiana Highway 44

Louisiana Highway 44 (LA 44) runs  in a general east–west direction from LA 42 in Prairieville, Ascension Parish to US 61 in LaPlace, St. John the Baptist Parish.

Louisiana Highway 45

Louisiana Highway 45 (LA 45) runs  in a north–south direction from a dead end in Lafitte to a junction with LA 18 in Marrero, Jefferson Parish.

Louisiana Highway 46

Louisiana Highway 46 (LA 46) runs  in an east–west direction from the junction of LA 39 and LA 3021 in New Orleans, Orleans Parish to a dead end in Shell Beach, St. Bernard Parish.

Louisiana Highway 47

Louisiana Highway 47 (LA 47) runs  in a general southeast to northwest direction from a local road in Chalmette, St. Bernard Parish to the junction of two local roads in New Orleans, Orleans Parish.

Louisiana Highway 48

Louisiana Highway 48 (LA 48) runs  in an east–west direction from US 61 in Norco, St. Charles Parish to the junction of US 90 and LA 3152 in Elmwood, Jefferson Parish.

Louisiana Highway 49

Louisiana Highway 49 (LA 49) runs  in a general north–south direction from US 61 to the junction of two local roads in Kenner, Jefferson Parish.

Louisiana Highway 50

Louisiana Highway 50 (LA 50) runs  in a north–south direction along Almedia Road in St. Rose, St. Charles Parish.

The route heads northward from an intersection with LA 48 (River Road) at the Mississippi River, crossing both the Canadian National Railway (CN) and Kansas City Southern Railway (KCS) tracks at grade, to a point on US 61 (Airline Highway) just east of an interchange with I-310.  It is an undivided two-lane highway for its entire length.

LA 50 was created in the 1955 Louisiana Highway renumbering, and its route has remained the same to the present day.

Louisiana Highway 52

Louisiana Highway 52 (LA 52) runs  in a north–south direction from the junction of US 90 and LA 633 in Boutte to LA 18 in Luling, St. Charles Parish.

Louisiana Highway 53

Louisiana Highway 53 (LA 53) runs  in a north–south direction along Central Avenue in Reserve, St. John the Baptist Parish.

The route begins at the intersection of LA 44 (River Road) and LA 640 opposite the defunct Edgard–Reserve Ferry landing at the Mississippi River.  It proceeds northward along Central Avenue, crossing both the Canadian National Railway (CN) and Kansas City Southern Railway (KCS) tracks at grade, to a junction with US 61 (West Airline Highway).  LA 53 is an undivided two-lane highway for its entire length.

LA 53 was created in the 1955 Louisiana Highway renumbering, and its route has remained the same to the present day.

Louisiana Highway 54

Louisiana Highway 54 (LA 54) runs  in a north–south direction from LA 44 to US 61 in Garyville, St. John the Baptist Parish.

Louisiana Highway 55

Louisiana Highway 55 (LA 55) runs  in a north–south direction from a dead end south of Montegut to a junction with LA 24 in Bourg, Terrebonne Parish.

Louisiana Highway 56

Louisiana Highway 56 (LA 56) runs  in a north–south direction from a local road in Cocodrie to a junction with LA 24 in Houma, Terrebonne Parish.

The route heads north from Cocodrie and follows Little Caillou Road along the west bank of Bayou Petit Caillou.  It intersects the southern terminus of LA 57 (Bayou Sale Road) and proceeds north, eventually crossing a swing bridge over a canal connecting with Lake Boudreaux.  LA 56 passes through the community of Chauvin and intersects LA 58 (Sarah Road), a short connector to the parallel LA 55 at Montegut.  Curving to the northwest, LA 56 skirts the Houma city limits and becomes known as East Main Street.  The route proceeds a short distance further to a T-intersection with LA 24 next to the Houma–Terrebonne Airport in an area known as Presque Isle.  LA 56 is an undivided two-lane highway for its entire length.

Louisiana Highway 57

Louisiana Highway 57 (LA 57) runs  in a north–south direction from LA 56 north of Cocodrie to LA 24 in Houma, Terrebonne Parish.

Louisiana Highway 58

Louisiana Highway 58 (LA 58) runs  in an east–west direction along Sarah Road, a short connector between LA 56 in Chauvin and LA 55 in Montegut, Terrebonne Parish.

LA 56 and LA 55 travel along opposite banks of Bayou Terrebonne and Bayou Petit Caillou, respectively.  LA 58 crosses a vertical lift bridge over each waterway to connect the two highways southeast of Houma.  It is an undivided two-lane highway for its entire length.

In the pre-1955 state highway system, LA 58 was designated as State Route 969.  LA 58 was created in the 1955 Louisiana Highway renumbering, and its route has remained the same to the present day.

Louisiana Highway 59

Louisiana Highway 59 (LA 59) runs  in a north–south direction from US 190 in Mandeville to LA 21 north of Abita Springs, St. Tammany Parish.

Louisiana Highway 60

Louisiana Highway 60 (LA 60) runs  in an east–west direction from LA 16 in Enon to LA 10 in Bogalusa, Washington Parish.

The highway follows a winding rural alignment northeast from Enon.  The route intersects LA 1072 at Plainview, connecting with Franklinton Airport.  Proceeding eastward, LA 60 makes a right-angle turn northward to a T-intersection with LA 439.  The route turns east into Bogalusa, where it becomes known as West 10th Street, and makes several zigzags through the city's street grid: north onto Avenue K, east onto the continuation of West 10th Street, north onto Avenue F, east onto West 9th Street, and finally north onto Avenue B.  The roadway widens first to a divided two-lane highway then to an undivided four-lane highway as the surroundings transition from residential to commercial.  After passing Bogalusa High School, LA 60 narrows to two lanes once again and crosses the Bogue Lusa Creek onto Cumberland Street.  Cumberland Street soon branches off to the northeast, and LA 60 proceeds due north on Shenandoah Street a short distance to its terminus at LA 10 (Superior Avenue), the city's main east–west thoroughfare.

Louisiana Highway 62

Louisiana Highway 62 (LA 62) runs  in a north–south direction from LA 10 in Sheridan to the Mississippi state line north of State Line, Washington Parish.

Louisiana Highway 63

Louisiana Highway 63 (LA 63) runs  in a north–south direction from LA 444 east of French Settlement, Livingston Parish to LA 67 in Clinton, East Feliciana Parish.

The route begins at a four-way intersection with LA 444 and Old Frost Road. From here, LA 63 heads north along Frost Road on an undivided two-lane highway and traverses forest for  before reaching an intersection with LA 42 east of Colyell.  later, LA 63 comes to an interchange with I-12 (exit 22) and briefly becomes a divided two-lane highway to accommodate the interchange. At this interchange, LA 63 enters the town of Livingston. Shortly after passing through the town center, LA 63 makes a brief jog west onto US 190 (Florida Boulevard) before continuing its northward trajectory. At this point, LA 63 has gained the local name of North Range Road and heads north for  before intersecting the western terminus of LA 442, which heads east to Tickfaw. Shortly after this intersection, LA 63 makes several curves before intersecting LA 449, with which it has a brief concurrency. At an intersection with LA 1019, LA 1019 continues the route west while LA 63 turns to the northwest, intersecting routes such as LA 447 and LA 1023, heading west before coming to an intersection with LA 16. From this intersection, LA 63 begins a  concurrency with LA 16 before splitting off to the north west of Pine Grove. After , LA 63 comes to an intersection with LA 37, running concurrent with the route for  before splitting off to the north again, curving to the northwest at an intersection with LA 960. Shortly after, LA 63 intersects LA 959. LA 63 continues northwest for a final  before coming to its northern terminus at LA 67 in Clinton.

Louisiana Highway 64

Louisiana Highway 64 (LA 64) runs  in a general east–west direction from LA 964 in Zachary, East Baton Rouge Parish to the junction of LA 16 and LA 1026 north of Denham Springs, Livingston Parish.

Louisiana Highway 66

Louisiana Highway 66 (LA 66) runs  in a general northwest to southeast direction from the main entrance of the Louisiana State Penitentiary at Angola to a junction with US 61 north of St. Francisville, West Feliciana Parish.

Louisiana Highway 67

Louisiana Highway 67 (LA 67) runs  in a north–south direction from LA 73 in Baton Rouge, East Baton Rouge Parish to the Mississippi state line north of Clinton, East Feliciana Parish.  The route continues across the state line as Mississippi Highway 569. As of 2018, the section of LA 67 south of US 190 is under agreement to be removed from the state highway system and transferred to local control.

Louisiana Highway 68

Louisiana Highway 68 (LA 68) runs  in a north–south direction from US 61 north of Port Hudson to LA 19 in Wilson, East Feliciana Parish.

Louisiana Highway 69

Louisiana Highway 69 (LA 69) runs  in a north–south direction from LA 70 in Grand Bayou, Assumption Parish to LA 1 northwest of White Castle, Iberville Parish.

Louisiana Highway 70

Louisiana Highway 70 (LA 70) runs  in a north–south direction from the junction of US 90, US 90 Bus., and LA 182 in Morgan City, St. Mary Parish to LA 22 in Sorrento, Ascension Parish.

Louisiana Highway 72

Louisiana Highway 72 (LA 72) runs  in an east–west direction from the junction of two local roads to a junction with the concurrent US 79/US 80 in Bossier City, Bossier Parish.

Louisiana Highway 73

Louisiana Highway 73 (LA 73) runs  in a general north–south direction from LA 75 in Geismar, Ascension Parish to LA 30 in Baton Rouge, East Baton Rouge Parish.

Louisiana Highway 74

Louisiana Highway 74 (LA 74) runs  in an east–west direction from LA 75 in St. Gabriel, Iberville Parish to US 61 north of Gonzales, Ascension Parish.

Louisiana Highway 75

Louisiana Highway 75 (LA 75) runs  in a general east–west direction from a dead end in Bayou Pigeon, Iberville Parish to the junction of LA 22 and LA 942 in Darrow, Ascension Parish.

Louisiana Highway 76

Louisiana Highway 76 (LA 76) runs  in an east–west direction from LA 77 in Maringouin, Iberville Parish to the junction of LA 1 and LA 987-4 in Port Allen, West Baton Rouge Parish.

Louisiana Highway 77

Louisiana Highway 77 (LA 77) runs  in a north–south direction from LA 1 in Plaquemine, Iberville Parish to LA 10 north of Fordoche, Pointe Coupee Parish.

Louisiana Highway 78

Louisiana Highway 78 (LA 78) runs  in a north–south direction from the junction of US 190 and LA 411 in Livonia to LA 1 in Parlange, Pointe Coupee Parish.

Louisiana Highway 81

Louisiana Highway 81 (LA 81) runs  in a general southeast to northwest direction from LA 77 in Livonia to a second junction with LA 77 in Fordoche, Pointe Coupee Parish.

Louisiana Highway 82

Louisiana Highway 82 (LA 82) runs  in a general east–west direction from the Texas state line west of Cameron, Cameron Parish to the Vermilion–Lafayette parish line southwest of Youngsville.

Louisiana Highway 83

Louisiana Highway 83 (LA 83) runs  in a general east–west direction from LA 14 in New Iberia, Iberia Parish to LA 182 in Baldwin, St. Mary Parish.

Louisiana Highway 85

Louisiana Highway 85 (LA 85) runs  in an east–west direction from LA 83 in Lydia to LA 182 in Jeanerette, Iberia Parish.

Louisiana Highway 86

Louisiana Highway 86 (LA 86) runs  in a general north–south direction from LA 182 in New Iberia to LA 31 north of New Iberia, Iberia Parish.

Louisiana Highway 87

Louisiana Highway 87 (LA 87) runs  in a northwest to southeast direction from LA 86 in New Iberia, Iberia Parish to a local road north of Centerville, St. Mary Parish.

Louisiana Highway 88

Louisiana Highway 88 (LA 88) runs  in an east–west direction from LA 89 at Lozes to LA 182 northwest of New Iberia, Iberia Parish.

Louisiana Highway 89

Louisiana Highway 89 (LA 89) runs  in a north–south direction from LA 14 in Delcambre, Vermilion Parish to a local road in Youngsville, Lafayette Parish.

There is one hyphenated route, LA 89-1, which runs  also in a north–south direction from a roundabout at Iberia Street in Youngsville, to US 90/LA 182 on the Lafayette–Broussard municipal boundary.

Louisiana Highway 91

Louisiana Highway 91 (LA 91) runs  in a north–south direction from a local road south of Gueydan, Vermilion Parish to LA 13 in Eunice, St. Landry Parish.

Louisiana Highway 92

Louisiana Highway 92 (LA 92) runs  in an east–west direction from US 90 east of Mermentau, Acadia Parish to LA 339 in Youngsville, Lafayette Parish.

There is one hyphenated route, LA 92-1, which runs  also in an east–west direction from the intersection of Iberia Street and Young Street in Youngsville, to LA 347 south of St. Martinville, St. Martin Parish.

Louisiana Highway 93

Louisiana Highway 93 (LA 93) runs  in a general north–south direction from US 90 in Scott, Lafayette Parish to LA 31 in Arnaudville, St. Martin Parish.

LA 93 has one hyphenated route, known as LA 93-1, which runs  in a north–south direction along Rue de Belier between LA 342 in Lafayette and a point, less than one mile south of Dulles Road in Scott. This minor route is located entirely within Lafayette Parish.

Louisiana Highway 94

Louisiana Highway 94 (LA 94) runs  in a southwest to northeast direction from the junction of US 90 and US 167 in Lafayette, Lafayette Parish to LA 328 in Breaux Bridge, St. Martin Parish.

Louisiana Highway 95

Louisiana Highway 95 (LA 95) runs  in a north–south direction from US 90 in Duson, Lafayette Parish to LA 104 in Mamou, Evangeline Parish. A  spur route, LA 95 Spur, provides a shortcut along LA 95 in St. Landry Parish east of Eunice. It connects LA 95 at the south to US 190, LA 95, and LA 758 to the north.

Louisiana Highway 96

Louisiana Highway 96 (LA 96) runs  in an east–west direction from LA 182 in Broussard, Lafayette Parish to LA 352 east of Catahoula, St. Martin Parish.

Louisiana Highway 97

Louisiana Highway 97 (LA 97) runs  in a north–south direction from the junction of US 90 and LA 102 in Jennings, Jefferson Davis Parish to US 190 east of Basile, Acadia Parish.

Louisiana Highway 98

Louisiana Highway 98 (LA 98) runs  in an east–west direction from the junction of LA 97 and LA 1123 west of Iota, Acadia Parish to the Lafayette–St. Martin parish line east of Carencro.

Louisiana Highway 99

Louisiana Highway 99 (LA 99) runs  in a north–south direction from LA 14 west of Lake Arthur, Jefferson Davis Parish to US 190 in an area of Allen Parish east of Kinder.

See also

References

Footnotes

Works cited

External links
Maps / GIS Data Homepage, Louisiana Department of Transportation and Development